Amine Aouichaoui (born 18 July 1982) is a retired Tunisian football striker.

References

1982 births
Living people
Tunisian footballers
Club Africain players
ES Hammam-Sousse players
AS Gabès players
Olympique du Kef players
Grombalia Sports players
ES Métlaoui players
US Ben Guerdane players
AS Kasserine players
AS Marsa players
US Monastir (football) players
Association football forwards
Tunisian Ligue Professionnelle 1 players